Rebecca Dawn Brewerton (born 20 October 1982) is a Welsh professional golfer and a member of the Ladies European Tour and the LPGA Tour.

Amateur career
Brewerton was born in St Asaph, Wales. She had a successful amateur career. She was Welsh Girls Champion in 1997 and 1998 and Welsh Ladies' Amateur Champion in 1999 and 2001. She won the Ladies' British Open Amateur Stroke Play Championship in 1999 and 2002, a year she also won the European Ladies Amateur Championship

Brewerton represented Great Britain and Ireland in the Curtis Cup in 2000, and the Vagliano Trophy in 2001 and 2003. She was in line to be selected to the 2002 Curtis Cup squad but was not selected for the final team. She played in the 2002 Espirito Santo Trophy World Amateur Golf Team Championships and was named as the Daily Telegraph Golfer of the year.

Brewerton received two invitations to play on the Ladies European Tour in 2003. She held the halfway lead at the Tenerife Ladies Open in May finally finishing the tournament in second place and was beaten into second place again at the Wales WPGA Championship by a 74-foot birdie putt on the final green by Shani Waugh.

Brewerton turned professional after she finished 13th at the 2003 Ladies European Tour Qualifying School.

Professional career
In her 2004 rookie season, Brewerton was second in the Ryder Cup Wales Rookie of the Year competition and finished eighth on the LET Order of Merit with four top ten finishes. She had four more top tens in 2005 which gave her a 19th-place finish on the money list. In 2006, she had five top tens and finished 15th on the New Star Money List.

In 2005, together with Becky Morgan, Brewerton finished sixth in the Women's World Cup of Golf in South Africa. The pair improved on that performance in 2006 finishing third, added an eighth-place finish in 2007 and a sixth place in 2008.

Brewerton's maiden professional victory was a three stroke win at the 2007 Ladies English Open. This, plus four other top ten finishes, earned her a place on the 2007 European Solheim Cup Team, the first Welsh golfer to play on a Solheim Cup team. She placed second in the BBC Wales Sports Personality of the Year in 2007, and was voted The Towergate Professional Player of the Year.

Brewerton's second LET victory was at the 2009 Open De España Femenino. This earned her the final place in the Evian Masters the following week which she led for three of the four days before finishing 13th, the highest finish by an LET player. These performances led to her selection as a captain's pick for the 2009 European Solheim Cup team and to the BBC Wales Sports Personality of the Year Award shortlist.

In December 2010, she finished 20th at the Final LPGA Qualifying Tournament to earn membership on the LPGA Tour for 2011 with low playing priority.

Professional wins (4)

Ladies European Tour wins (2)
2007 (1) Ladies English Open
2009 (1) Open De España Femenino

Other wins
2011 (1) Tenerife Ladies Match Play (unofficial Ladies European Tour)
2021 (1) Rose Ladies Series at Brockenhurst Manor

Ladies European Tour career summary

Official as of 20 September 2009.

Team appearances
Amateur
European Ladies' Team Championship (representing Wales): 1999,  2001, 2003
Curtis Cup (representing Great Britain & Ireland): 2000
Vagliano Trophy (representing Great Britain & Ireland): 2001, 2003 (winners)
European Lady Junior's Team Championship (representing Wales): 2002
Espirito Santo Trophy (representing Great Britain & Ireland): 2002

Professional
Solheim Cup (representing Europe): 2007, 2009
World Cup (representing Wales): 2005, 2006, 2007, 2008

Solheim Cup record

References

External links

Welsh female golfers
Ladies European Tour golfers
LPGA Tour golfers
Solheim Cup competitors for Europe
People educated at Ysgol Glan Clwyd
Sportspeople from St Asaph
1982 births
Living people